Muriel, whose name is derived from the Greek myrrh, is a Domination or Dominion (one of the 'Second Sphere' Angels) in Western Christian Angelology. Muriel is the Angel of the Month of June, is associated with the astrological sign of cancer, and is invoked from the South. In the apocryphal Enthronement of Abbaton, Muriel becomes Abaddon, the angel of death.

See also
 List of angels in theology

References

Angels in Christianity
Individual angels
Myrrh